Jimmy Mac or Jimmy Mack may refer to:

 Jimmy Mac (actor) (1902–1984), British actor
 "Jimmy Mack", a 1967 song by Martha and the Vandellas
 Jimmy Mack (broadcaster) (1934–2004), Scottish television and radio presenter
 Jimmy McMillan (born 1946), American political activist
 James McNair (1952–2014), comedian "Uncle Jimmy Mack"